Clair H. "Okie" Blanchard (April 10, 1903 – September 10, 1989), sometimes spelled "Oakie", was an American football player, coach of football and basketball, and college athletics administrator.

His collegiate coaching career lasted one season, in 1940 with the University of Wyoming's Cowboys. His record was 1–7–1, earning the victory (7–3 over New Mexico) in his initial game, and the tie (scoreless against Colorado State) in his second.

He was more successful as a high school coach, serving in that capacity in Cheyenne, Wyoming for many years. The football stadium at Cheyenne East High School there (which was also used by Cheyenne Central High School until 2000) is named for Blanchard.  Blanchard also coached high school basketball in Cheyenne until 1958.

Blanchard was a graduate of the University of Wyoming, and in 1968 was one of the recipients of the Distinguished Alumni Award granted by the Alumni Association of that institution. In 1984, Blanchard was elected to the Wyoming Coaches Association Hall of Fame.

Blanchard died in 1989.

Head coaching record

College football

References

External links
 

1903 births
1989 deaths
Wyoming Cowboys and Cowgirls athletic directors
Wyoming Cowboys football coaches
Wyoming Cowboys football players
High school basketball coaches in Wyoming
High school football coaches in Wyoming
People from Warren County, Pennsylvania